Kasper Barfoed (born 1972) is a Danish film director.

Barfoed was born in 1972, in Copenhagen, Denmark. He has a bachelor's degree in comparative literature from the University of Copenhagen.

Selected filmography (as director)
The Lost Treasure of the Knights Templar (2006)
The Candidate (2008)
The Numbers Station (2013)
Sommeren '92 (2015)
Below the Surface (2017)

Selected television
Those Who Kill (2011)

References

External links

1972 births
Living people
Danish film directors